The Lycée Français International Charles de Gaulle de Pékin (LFIPCDG) is a French international school in Chaoyang District, Beijing. It has primary, junior high school (collège) and sixth-form/senior high school (lycée) levels.

It was previously the Lycée Français International de Pékin (LFIP; "The International French School of Beijing" ) in French, and years earlier it was the Lycée Français de Pékin.

The school first opened in 1967.

Student body
In 2014 the school had 950 students. At one time the school had 1,050 students. In 2019 it had 826 students.

 its students originate from over 50 countries: 75% originate from Europe, 17% originate from Africa, 4.5% originate from the Americas, and 3.5% originate from Asia and Oceania.

Campus locations
Since 10 May 2016, there is only one campus: in JingShunDongJie, Chaoyang District, Beijing 100600, China.

The campus opening ceremony was on 16 May 2016.

It was designed by a French architect, Jacques Ferrier; the total budget was 23.9 million euros (231 million Hong Kong dollars), with 16.5 million for building costs as well as other funds for a 40-year lease. The building has measures to prevent effects from Beijing's air pollution.

The groundbreaking ceremony for the new campus occurred on 19 October 2014. It has room for 1,500 students; this is an increase by 30% from the total capacity of the previous facilities.

Prior to May 2016 there were three campuses: one for nursery/preschool (maternelle) classes, one for primary and junior high school (collège), and the senior high school (lycée) facilities at Chaoyang Community College. The principal school campus was the primary and junior high campus.

See also
 École Française Internationale de Canton
 Lycée Français de Shanghai

References

External links

 Lycée Français International Charles de Gaulle de Pékin
 Lycée Français International Charles de Gaulle de Pékin 
 

Beijing
Schools in Chaoyang District, Beijing
International schools in Beijing
High schools in Beijing
Relocated schools